Janet Marshall Stevenson (February 4, 1913 – June 9, 2009) was an American writer, teacher and social activist from Oregon who wrote in the areas of civil rights, the women's movement, the peace movement, the environment and the arts. She published works in several fiction and non-fiction genres, and was recognized with several awards. She wrote a biography of California Attorney General Robert W. Kenny, who defended the Hollywood Ten before the House Un-American Activities Committee; she herself was placed on the Hollywood blacklist for her political beliefs and associations, along with her husband Philip Stevenson.

Early life and education
Janet Atlantis Marshall was born on February 4, 1913, in Chicago, Illinois, to John Carter, an investment banker, and Atlantis Octavia (née McClendon) Marshall.

Marshall graduated from Bryn Mawr College in 1933 and received an MFA in theater arts from Yale University in 1937.

Marshall married playwright and screenwriter Philip Edward Stevenson in New York City in 1939. They met while working for a summer stock theatre in Surry, Maine. The Stevensons collaborated on several plays, including "Counterattack," which was produced on Broadway in 1944. It was later turned into a successful motion picture of the same name. Janet and Philip had two sons, Joseph and Edward. The Stevensons were divorced in 1964 and Philip died while traveling in the Soviet Union in 1965. Janet Stevenson moved to Astoria, Oregon, the same year.

Career
Stevenson taught theater at the University of Southern California but was fired for her alleged ties to the Communist Party. She taught at Grambling College in Louisiana from 1966 to 1967, and served as a lecturer at Portland State University in 1968.

She served as cultural arts editor of the Chicago Weekly while she was in Chicago in the 1970s.

Stevenson published articles in American Heritage and the Atlantic Monthly among other magazines. Her literary agent was Barthold Fles.

Later life and death
Janet Stevenson lived Clatsop County, Oregon, from 1965 until her death in 2009. She lived at various times in Walluski, Hammond and Warrenton, and served two terms as the mayor of Hammond, beginning in 1986.

Stevenson married Benson Rotstein in 1965. In 1970, Rotstein's contract was not renewed by the Astoria School Board because of his involvement in the peace movement and his use of controversial materials in his classroom. He appealed to the American Association of University Professors, but their decision was still pending when he died in a boating accident on the Columbia River Bar the same year.

Janet Stevenson served as president of the Oregon Women's Political Caucus for many years and helped found the North Coast chapter of the organization.

Stevenson wrote The Slope in 2009 about Clatsop County doctor Bethenia Angelina Owens-Adair to "rescue Bethenia from obscurity"; it was published privately for Portland State University's "Walk of the Heroines" celebration.

Stevenson died in Warrenton on June 6, 2009. Her obituary describes her as "a lifelong campaigner for human rights, social justice and peace and a staunch advocate of equal rights for women."

Her papers include the manuscript for a book, The Last Town in Oregon, about her years as mayor of Hammond. It was not to be opened until her death.

Awards and honors
In 1938, Janet Stevenson won a John Golden Fellowship in playwriting; her fellow recipient that year was Tennessee Williams. She won a C.E.S. Wood Distinguished Writer Award from the Oregon Book Awards in 1990. In 1994, she was honored as an Oregon Woman of Achievement. Her novel Departure was selected in 2005 by the Oregon Cultural Heritage Commission for "Literary Oregon, 100 Books, 1800 – 2000", an exhibition in celebration of the centennial of the Oregon State Library. Her name is included in Portland State University's Walk of the Heroines.

Works

Novels
Weep No More: A Novel (1957)
The Ardent Years: A Novel (1960)
Sisters and Brothers: A Novel (1966)
Departure: A Novel (1985) [1985] (1997)
The Slope (2009)

Juvenile biography
Painting America's Wildlife: John James Audubon (1961)
Marian Anderson: Singing to the World (1963)
Pioneers in Freedom: Adventures in Courage (1969)
Spokesman for Freedom: The Life of Archibald Grimke (1969)

Travel
Woman Aboard [1969], (1981)

Juvenile history
Soldiers in the Civil Rights War: Adventures in Courage (1971)
The Montgomery Bus Boycott, December, 1955: American Blacks Demand an End to Segregation (1971)
Women's Rights (1972)The School Segregation Cases (Brown v. Board of Education of Topeka and Others): The United States Supreme Court Rules on Racially Separate Public Education (1973)

Drama
"Declaration" with Philip Stevenson (1940)
"Counter-Attack" with Philip Stevenson (1944)Counter-Attack (screenplay) (1945)The Man from Cairo (screenplay) (1953)
"The Third President" (a rewrite of "Declaration") (1976)

BiographyThe Undiminished Man: A Political Biography of Robert Walker Kenny (1980)

References

External links

Review of "Departure" from Kirkus Reviews''

Writers from Oregon
1913 births
2009 deaths
American feminists
Writers from Chicago
Mayors of places in Oregon
People from Clatsop County, Oregon
Bryn Mawr College alumni
Yale University alumni
University of Southern California faculty
Grambling State University faculty
Portland State University faculty
Women mayors of places in Oregon
20th-century American politicians
20th-century American women politicians
People from Warrenton, Oregon
American women academics
21st-century American women